Henry Hallett (1 February 1888 in Whitehaven, Cumbria, England, UK – 24 July 1952) was a British stage and film actor.

Filmography
 The Hound of the Baskervilles (1932)
 Jew Süss (1934)
 Tudor Rose (1936)
 Spy of Napoleon (1936)
 Victoria the Great (1937)
 Sixty Glorious Years (1938)
 Let's Be Famous (1939)
 The Thief of Bagdad (1940)
 Penn of Pennsylvania (1941)
 Salute John Citizen (1942)

References

External links
 

1888 births
1952 deaths
English male film actors
English male stage actors
People from Whitehaven
English male silent film actors
20th-century English male actors
20th-century British male actors